Cynthia Wilson (born 1934) is a Barbadian educator, performer and writer.

She was born in Saint Philip and was educated at the University College of the West Indies. Wilson taught English at high schools in Jamaica and Morocco. She returned to Barbados in 1969 and worked for the Ministry of Foreign Affairs and the Caribbean Tourism Research Centre. In 1973, she helped establish the National Independence Festival of Creative Arts. Wilson was a founding member of Stage One Theatre Productions, also serving as its president. She has been manager of the Barbados Dance Theatre Company and chair of the Association of Caribbean Theatre Artists. She has produced numerous dance, musical and theater productions and has performed as an actor and as a dancer. Cynthia Wilson's first book, a collection of short stories entitled Same Sea ... Another Wave, was published in 2001.

Selected works 
 Same Sea ... Another Wave, short stories
 Whispering of the Trees, novel

References 

1934 births
Barbadian women writers
Barbadian actresses
Living people
People from Saint Philip, Barbados
University of the West Indies alumni
20th-century Barbadian writers
20th-century Barbadian women writers
21st-century Barbadian writers
21st-century Barbadian women writers